Novomykhailivka is a village in Pokrovsk Raion in Donetsk Oblast of eastern Ukraine, 39.8 km southwest of the centre of Donetsk city.

There has been fighting in and around the village during the 2022 Russian invasion of Ukraine.

Demographics
Native language as of the Ukrainian Census of 2001:
Ukrainian 92.91%
Russian 6.74%
Belarusian 0.14%
Hungarian 0.07%

References

External links
 Weather forecast for Novomykhailivka

Villages in Pokrovsk Raion